Donald Woods (born Ralph Lewis Zink; December 2, 1906 – March 5, 1998) was a Canadian-American film and television actor whose career in Hollywood spanned six decades.

Life and career
Woods was born in Brandon, Manitoba, and moved with his family to California, where he was raised in Burbank. His parents were William and Margaret Zink, Presbyterians of German descent. His younger brother, Clarence Russell Zink, also became an actor (Russ Conway).

Woods graduated from the University of California, Berkeley, and made his film debut in 1928. His screen career was spent mostly in B movies, for example as lawyer Perry Mason in the 1937 film The Case of the Stuttering Bishop. He also played romantic leads in B comedies, notably the popular Mexican Spitfire series opposite Lupe Velez.

He also occasionally played major roles in bigger feature films like A Tale of Two Cities (1935), Anthony Adverse (1936), If I Had My Way (1940, as a doomed bridge worker), Watch on the Rhine (1943), The Bridge of San Luis Rey (1944), and Roughly Speaking (1945). In 1945 he co-starred in the Christmas-themed parable Star in the Night, as a hitchhiker who awakens a stone-hearted innkeeper to the true spirit of Christmas. Woods's sensitive performance attracted attention, and the film won the "Best Short Subject" Academy Award.

Of considerable importance to Donald Woods's acting career were several seasons as leading man with the Elitch Gardens Theatre Company in Denver, Colorado, where he performed in 1932, 1933, 1939, 1941, 1947, and 1948.

In the early days of television, Woods starred in "It's Only a Game", the October 17, 1950, episode of Armstrong Circle Theatre. He starred as the title character in the 1951 syndicated TV series Craig Kennedy, Criminologist, and he was the host of Damon Runyon Theater on CBS-TV. He played himself on the dramatic series Hotel Cosmopolitan, also on CBS, and he was one of three hosts of The Orchid Award on ABC-TV. He portrayed Walter Manning on Portia Faces Life on CBS.

He also appeared in such anthology series as The Philco Television Playhouse, Armstrong Circle Theatre, Robert Montgomery Presents, The United States Steel Hour, Crossroads, and General Electric Theater. On April 11, 1961, Woods appeared as "Professor Landfield" in the episode "Two for the Gallows" on NBC's Laramie western series. Series character Slim Sherman (John Smith) is hired under false pretenses to take Landfield into the  Badlands to seek gold. Landfield, however, is really Morgan Bennett, a member of the former Henry Plummer gang who has escaped from prison. Slim has no idea that Landfield is seeking the loot that his gang had hidden away. Series character Jess Harper (Robert Fuller), Pete Dixon, played by Warren Oates, and Pete's younger brother soon come to Slim's aid. The title stems from the talk that the undisciplined Dixon brothers might eventually wind up in a hangman's noose.

Woods later was a regular in the role of John Brent on the short-lived series Tammy and made guest appearances on Bat Masterson, Wagon Train, Ben Casey, 77 Sunset Strip, Hawaiian Eye,  Stoney Burke, Bourbon Street Beat, Bonanza, Coronet Blue, Ironside, Alias Smith and Jones, The Wild Wild West  and Owen Marshall: Counselor at Law, among many others before retiring from acting in 1976.

Besides his film career, he also worked as a successful real estate broker in Palm Springs, California, where he lived with his wife, childhood sweetheart Josephine Van der Horck. They were married from 1933 until his death and had two children, Linda and Conrad. He was interred at the Forest Lawn Cemetery in Cathedral City, California.

Partial filmography

As the Earth Turns (1934) - Stan
Merry Wives of Reno (1934) - Frank
Fog Over Frisco (1934) - Tony
Charlie Chan's Courage (1934) - Bob Crawford
She Was a Lady (1934) - Tommy Traill
Sweet Adeline (1934) - Sid Barnett
The Florentine Dagger (1935) - Juan Cesare
The Case of the Curious Bride (1935) - Carl
Stranded (1935) - John Wesley
Frisco Kid (1935) - Charles Ford
A Tale of Two Cities (1935) - Charles Darnay
The Story of Louis Pasteur (1936) - Dr. Jean Martel
Road Gang (1936) - James 'Jim' Larrabie
The White Angel (1936) - Charles Cooper
Anthony Adverse (1936) - Vincent Nolte
A Son Comes Home (1936) - Denny
Isle of Fury (1936) - Eric Blake
Once a Doctor (1937) - Dr.Steven Brace
Sea Devils (1937) - Steve Webb
The Case of the Stuttering Bishop (1937) - Perry Mason
Talent Scout (1937) - Steve Stewart
Charlie Chan on Broadway (1937) - Speed Patten
Big Town Girl (1937) - Mark Tracey
The Black Doll (1938) - Nick Halstead
Romance on the Run (1938) - Barry Drake
Danger on the Air (1938) - Benjamin Franklin Butts
Beauty for the Asking (1939) - Jeffrey Martin
The Girl from Mexico (1939) - Dennis 'Denny' Lindsay
Heritage of the Desert (1939) - John Abbott
Mexican Spitfire (1940) - Dennis Lindsay
City of Chance (1940) - Steve Walker
Forgotten Girls (1940) - Dan Donahue
If I Had My Way (1940) - Fred Johnson
Love, Honor and Oh-Baby! (1940) - Brian McGrath
Mexican Spitfire Out West (1940) - Dennis 'Denny' Lindsay
Sky Raiders (1941) - Captain Bob Dayton / John Kane
Bachelor Daddy (1941) - Edward Smith
I Was a Prisoner on Devil's Island (1941) - Joel Grant / Joseph Elmer
Thru Different Eyes (1942) - Ted Farnsworth
The Gay Sisters (1942) - Penn Sutherland Gaylord
Corregidor (1943) - Dr. Michael
Watch on the Rhine (1943) - David Farrelly
So's Your Uncle (1943) - Steve Curtis aka Uncle John
Hi'ya, Sailor (1943) - Bob Jackson
The Bridge of San Luis Rey (1944) - Brother Juniper
Enemy of Women (1944) - Dr. Hans Traeger, MD
Hollywood Canteen (1944) - Donald Woods
Roughly Speaking (1945) - Rodney Crane
God Is My Co-Pilot (1945) - (uncredited)
Wonder Man (1945) - Monte Rossen
Star in the Night (1945) - Hitchhiker
Night and Day (1946) - Ward Blackburn
Never Say Goodbye (1946) - Rex DeVallon
The Time, the Place and the Girl (1946) - Martin Drew
Bells of San Fernando (1947) - Michael 'Gringo' O'Brien
Stepchild (1947) - Ken Bullock
The Return of Rin Tin Tin (1947) - Father Matthew
Daughter of the West (1949) - Commissioner Ralph C. Connors
Barbary Pirate (1949) - Maj. Tom Blake
Scene of the Crime (1949) - Bob Herkimer
Free for All (1949) - Roger Abernathy
Johnny One-Eye (1950) - Vet
The Lost Volcano (1950) - Paul Gordon
Mr. Music (1950) - Tippy Carpenter
The Du Pont Story (1950) - Irénée du Pont
All That I Have (1951) - Pastor William Goodwin
Born to the Saddle (1953) - Matt Daggett
The Beast from 20,000 Fathoms (1953) - Capt. Phil Jackson
I'll Give My Life (1960) - Pastor Goodwin
13 Ghosts (1960) - Cyrus Zorba
Five Minutes to Live (1961) - Ken Wilson
Kissin' Cousins (1964) - General Alvin Donford
Moment to Moment (1965) - Mr. Singer
Dimension 5 (1966) - Kane
Tammy and the Millionaire (1967) - John Brent
A Time to Sing (1968) - Vernon Carter
True Grit (1969) - 'Barlow'
Sweet Revenge (1976) - Car Salesman (uncredited)

References

External links

1906 births
1998 deaths
20th-century American male actors
Male actors from Manitoba
American male television actors
American male film actors
Burials at Forest Lawn Cemetery (Cathedral City)
Canadian male television actors
Canadian male film actors
Canadian emigrants to the United States
Male actors from Palm Springs, California
People from Brandon, Manitoba
People from Greater Los Angeles
University of California, Berkeley alumni
20th-century Canadian male actors
Canadian people of German descent
American people of German descent